Silver Cycles is an album by American jazz saxophonist Eddie Harris recorded in 1968 and released on the Atlantic label. The album features heavy Latin jazz and postbop themes, accompanied by electronic processing.

Reception
The Allmusic review states "The music is by turns swinging, touching, feverish, detached, nightmarish, and peaceful, bursting with new ideas generated from Harris' plunge into electronics. This album has been unjustly overlooked, probably because Harris was selling a lot of records and getting airplay at the time (a cardinal sin for purists), or perhaps for its free, anything-goes '60s spirit".

Track listing
All compositions by Eddie Harris except as indicated
 "Free at Last" - 3:15 
 "1974 Blues" - 4:22 
 "Smoke Signals" - 2:55 
 "Coltrane's View" (Jodie Christian) - 4:08 
 "I'm Gonna Leave You by Yourself" - 3:00 
 "Silver Cycles" (Harris, Melvin Jackson) - 5:50 
 "Little Bit" - 5:29 
 "Electric Ballad" - 2:54 
 "Infrapolations" - 6:36 
Recorded in New York City on September 4 (tracks 1, 2, 4, 6, 8 & 9), and December 3 (tracks 3, 5 & 7), 1968

Personnel
Eddie Harris - tenor saxophone, varitone
Jodie Christian (tracks 1, 2, 4, 6, 8 & 9), Joe Zawinul (track 7) - piano
Richard Davis (tracks 3, 5 & 7), Melvin Jackson (tracks 1, 2, 4, 6, 8 & 9) - bass 
Monk Montgomery - electric bass (track 7)
Bruno Carr (tracks 1, 2 & 6-8), Billy Hart (tracks 3, 5 & 7), Richard Smith (tracks 4 & 9) - drums
Bernie Glow (track 1), Melvin Lastie (track 2), Joe Newman (tracks 1 & 2), Ernie Royal (tracks 1 & 7), Snooky Young (tracks 2 & 7) - trumpet
Benny Powell - trombone (tracks 1 & 2)
Phil Bodner, (track 7), Seldon Powell (tracks 1, 2 & 7) - tenor saxophone 
Haywood Henry - baritone saxophone (tracks 2 & 7)
Marcelino Valdez - percussion (tracks 6 & 8) 
Eileen Gilbert, Melba Moore, Valerie Simpson, Maeretha Stewart - vocals (tracks 3 & 5) 
Unidentified string section conducted by Gene Orloff (tracks 3 & 5)

References 

Eddie Harris albums
1969 albums
Albums produced by Arif Mardin
Albums produced by Joel Dorn
Atlantic Records albums